This article describes the use of prepositions and postpositions in Latvian grammar.

The lists below are organized according to the case of the noun phrase following the preposition. In the plural, however, all prepositions in Latvian can be described as governing the dative case. For example:
 singular: bez manis/*man "without me-gen/*me-dat"
 plural: bez mums/*mūsu "without us-dat/*us-gen"

Examples 

Sometimes plural nouns are found in the dative case for some prepositions.

Archaic forms

Semi-prepositions 

Latvian has also some adverbs, known as pusprievārdi "semi-prepositions", which can be used like prepositions or postpositions, in combination with a dative noun phrase:
 cauri - through
 garām - past, over, by
 iepretim - in front of
 līdzi - with
 pāri - over, across
 pretī - in front of, against

Postpositions

The following postpositions govern the genitive case, in both singular and plural:

 dēļ - through, of, for
 labad - for, for the sake of
 pēc - because of

See also

 Latvian declension

Latvian grammar